The Time Beneath The Sky is the third studio album of Polish progressive rock group Quidam, released 2002.

Track listing 

 "Letter from the Desert I" (Florek, Meller) –	6:12
 "Still Waiting (Letter from the Desert II)" (Derkowska, Florek, Meller) – 4:48
 "No Quarter" (Jones, Page, Plant) – 11:44
 "New Name" (Derkowska, Florek, Meller) – 4:45
 "Kozolec (For Agape)" (Derkowska, Florek, Meller) – 5:00
 "The Time Beneath the Sky: Credo I" (Derkowska, Florek, Meller) – 8:04
 "The Time Beneath the Sky: Credo II" (Florek, Meller) – 5:13
 "The Time Beneath the Sky: You Are (In the Labyrinth of Thoughts)" (Derkowska, Florek, Meller) – 4:31
 "The Time Beneath the Sky: Quimpromptu" (Florek, Jermakow, Meller, Scholl, Zasada) – 9:35
 "The Time Beneath the Sky: (Everything Has Its Own) Time Beneath the Sky" (Derkowska, Florek, Meller) – 3:59

Personnel 

 Emilia Derkowska – vocal, backing vocals
 Zbyszek Florek – keyboards
 Maciej Meller – guitars
 Jacek Zasada – flutes
 Radek Scholl – bass guitar
 Rafał Jermakow – drums

Guest musician
 Monika Margielewska – oboe "Letter From The Desert I"
 Miłosz Gawryłkiewicz – flugelhorn "Still Waiting (Letter From The Desert II)"
 Grzegorz Nadolny – contrabass "You Are (In The Labyrinth Of Thoughts)"

References

2002 albums
Quidam (band) albums